Tršić (Serbian Cyrillic: Тршић) is a village in the municipality of Loznica, located in the Mačva region of Serbia. It is the birthplace of Serbian linguist and language reformer, Vuk Stefanović Karadžić. Most houses in the area are built out of wood.

The village was destroyed by Ottoman forces during the Serbian Revolution, but was repaired and transformed into a museum to Karadžić.

Tršić's closest settlement to it is Vukanovac.

House of Vuk

When making the ethno-park, attention was paid to the desire to permanently mark and preserve the memories of Vuk and his work, and to preserve the natural environment and spatial values. In 1933, at the place where Vuk Karadžić's family home was, the memorial house was built: a two-piece log cabin and part of the basement, covered in a steep roof. One part of the chalets are a house and room, and another warehouse, kačara and corn-store. The house is a department with an open fireplace, furniture and dishes, characteristic of the houses from the 19th century. The room contains a bed, table, bench, icons, gusle, and Vuk's portrait from the 1816th, by Pavel Đurković.

On the occasion of 100 years of the death of Vuk (in 1964) student work brigades on your action "Tršić 64" raised an amphitheater with a stage that was needed for organizing the "Vuk's Council", and "Vuk's Student Council". In 1987. The Tršić receives a comprehensive look as cultural-historical and monumental whole. Also, the road from Vuk's home to Tronoša monastery was built.

Vuk's birth house was declared Monument of Culture of Exceptional Importance in 1979, and it is protected by Republic of Serbia.

Gallery

See also

Monument of Culture of Exceptional Importance
Tourism in Serbia
Vuk Stefanović Karadžić

References

External links
Tršić 

Architecture in Serbia
Populated places in Mačva District
Loznica